This is a list of ship classes used by the Spanish Nationalists during the Spanish civil war.

Battleships 

 España-class battleship–one seized by the Nationalists at the start of the war called España formerly  Alfonso XIII.

Crusiers

Heavy Cruisers 

 Canarias-class cruiser–These ships were built as modified County-class crusiers and the two ships of the class Canarias and Baleares were both seized by the Nationalists at the start of the civil war.

Light Crusiers 

 Almirante Cervera-class cruiser–Built as modified Emerald-class crusier. The lead ship of the class Almirante Cervera was seized by the Nationalists at the start of the civil war.
 Spanish cruiser Navarra (1923)–A unique cruiser which resembled a British World War I-era Town-class cruiser (1910) with modifications. Seized by Nationalists at start of war.

Destroyers 

 Alsedo-class destroyer–seized one ship of the class, Velasco, at the beginning of the war.
 Churruca-class destroyer (1927)–One ship of the class, Ciscar, was destroyed by the nationalists and then refloated to see service with them towards the end of the war.
Ceuta-class destroyer–This class comprised two old World War I era Vifor Class destroyers brought from Italy and put into service roughly in the middle of the war.
Huesca-class destroyer–This class was once again two old World War I era destroyers brought from Italy this time two Alessandro Poerio-class destroyers. An example of this class and the only ship of the class not bought by the Spanish Nationalists is the Italian cruiser Cesare Rossarol.

Auxiliary crusiers 

 List of auxiliary and merchant cruisers

Submarines 

 Archimede-class submarine (Bought from Italy and renamed General Mola Class.)

 Perla-class submarine (Two ships lent to Nationalists by Italy for a period.)

References

Spanish Navy